The Tubes is the debut studio album by The Tubes. Songs which received significant airplay from this album include "What Do You Want from Life?" and "White Punks on Dope", the latter of which peaked at number 28 on the UK singles chart. The album was dedicated to Bob McIntosh and Tom Donahue.

Track listing
Side One
"Up from the Deep" (The Tubes, Ray Trainer) – 4:28
"Haloes" (Al Kooper, Bill Spooner, Roger Steen) – 4:53
"Space Baby" (Bill Spooner, Mike Carpenter, Vince Welnick) – 4:25
"Malagueña Salerosa" (Pedro Galindo, Elpidio Ramirez) - 3:52

Side Two
"Mondo Bondage" (The Tubes) – 4:34
"What Do You Want from Life?" (Bill Spooner, Michael Evans) – 4:01
"Boy Crazy" (Bill Spooner) – 4:09
"White Punks on Dope" (Bill Spooner, Roger Steen, Michael Evans) – 6:49

Personnel
Adapted from Discogs.
Fee Waybill – vocals
Bill Spooner – guitar, vocals
Roger Steen – guitar, vocals
Michael Cotten – synthesizer
Vince Welnick – keyboards
Rick Anderson – bass
Prairie L'Emprere Prince – drums
Dominic Frontiere – string and horn arrangements
Technical
Lee Rhett Kiefer – engineer
Al Kooper – mixing
Lee Rhett Kiefer – mixing
Roland Young – art direction
Michael Cotten – design
Prairie Prince – design
Ian Patrick – photography
Harry Mittman – photography

Cover versions
 Mötley Crüe covered "White Punks on Dope" on their album New Tattoo, and performs it live in concert on their "Lewd, Crüed, & Tattooed" DVD.  The Nina Hagen Band interpreted the song in a German-language version, translated to "TV-Glotzer" (with re-written lyrics about being an East German who lives vicariously by staring at West German television all day) on their self-titled debut album in 1978. In the 1993 film Fear of a Black Hat, the band N.W.H. (with Ric Ocasek of The Cars) perform a parody of "White Punks on Dope", titled "White Cops on Dope".

References

The Tubes albums
1975 debut albums
Albums produced by Al Kooper
Albums recorded at Record Plant (Los Angeles)
A&M Records albums